Jack Patrick Broadhead (born 2 October 1994) is an English footballer who plays as a defender for Worksop Town.

Playing career
Born in Mansfield, England, and growing up as a Liverpool supporter, Broadhead began his career at Chesterfield, and was named as the club's Young Player of the Year in 2011–12.

He made his first team debut at the Proact Stadium in the FA Cup on 3 November 2012, replacing Mark Randall 89 minutes into a 6–1 victory over Hartlepool United. Later in the month he was offered his first senior contract at the club, which would secure him as a "Spireites" player until summer 2015; the team's youth coach, Dave Bentley, said that such a lengthy contract was "unheard of really for... a young player at this stage of the season".

On 17 August 2013 he signed for Northern Premier League side Buxton on a months loan. On 11 September 2013 he extended his stay at Buxton until 17 November 2013. After making sixteen appearances in all competitions, Broadhead returned to his parent club, though the club's manager expressed Broadhead would one day make a return to Buxton. Broadhead, himself, stated his loan spell at Buxton helped him progress.

On 2 January 2014, Broadhead joined Evo-Stik NPL Premier Division side Worksop Town on loan for the second time this season until 1 February 2014. Then on 26 March 2014, Broadhead joined Northern Premier League side Matlock Town on loan for the rest of the 2013–14 campaign.

At the start of the 2014–15 season, Broadhead made his first Chesterfield start on 2 September 2014 in Chesterfield's 2–0 Football League Trophy First Round defeat at Scunthorpe United. He was sent-off in the 84th minute after receiving two yellow cards. Following this, Broadhead re-joined Buxton for the second time on 4 October 2014.

On 21 November 2014, Broadhead joined Frickley Athletic on a one-month loan. Soon after, Broadhead's loan spell at Chesterfield was extended until 17 January 2015, as well as, addition of 24-hour clause. On 17 May 2015, Broadhead was released by Chesterfield. Following his release, Broadhead joined Mickleover Sports.

Broadhead joined Boston United on the transfer deadline day in March 2017. In January 2018, he was loaned out to his former club Buxton for the rest of the season.

Broadhead spent the 2018/19 season with A.F.C. Mansfield, before joining Grantham Town ahead of the 2019/20 season. He left the club in February 2020 to join Pontefract Collieries.

Statistics

Honours
Individual
Chesterfield F.C. Young Player of the Year: 2011–12

References

External links

Jack Broadhead career stats at Chesterfield official site

1994 births
Living people
English footballers
Association football defenders
Chesterfield F.C. players
Buxton F.C. players
Worksop Town F.C. players
Matlock Town F.C. players
Frickley Athletic F.C. players
Mickleover Sports F.C. players
Boston United F.C. players
A.F.C. Mansfield players
Grantham Town F.C. players
Pontefract Collieries F.C. players
Northern Premier League players